This is a list of episodes for Spring Baking Championship.

Series overview

Season 1 (2015)

There are 8 professional and home bakers competing in a 6-episode baking tournament. One person is eliminated every week until the last episode where the final three compete for the grand prize of $50,000.

Contestants
1st - Andy Chlebana, Pastry Instructor from Plainfield, Illinois 
2nd/3rd - Damiano Carrara, Bakery Owner & Pastry Chef from Moorpark, California
2nd/3rd - Dwayne Ingraham, Executive Pastry Chef from Oxford, Mississippi
4th - Simone Faure, Bakery Owner from St. Louis, Missouri
5th - Sandy Hunter, Assistant Pastry Chef from Chicago, Illinois
6th - Juliana Evans, Stay-at-Home Mom from Orlando, Florida
7th - Kristine de la Cruz, Bakery Owner from Los Angeles, California
8th - Chris Taylor, Epidemiologist from Atlanta, Georgia

Elimination Table

 (WINNER) The contestant won the competition.
 (RUNNER-UP) The contestant made it to the finale, but did not win.
 (WIN) The contestant won the challenge for that week.
 (HIGH) The contestant was one of the selection committee's favorites for that week.
 (IN) The contestant performed well enough to move on to the next week.  
 (LOW) The contestant was one of the selection committee's three or four least favorites for that week, but was not eliminated.
 (OUT) The contestant was the selection committee's least favorite for that week, and was eliminated.

Season 2 (2016)
Eight professional and home bakers come to compete in a six-episode baking tournament. This season is the last season with Bobby Deen as host. This season also began the mid-round twists in main heat challenges that are a staple of other baking championships competitions.

Contestants
1st - Jane Soudah, Pastry Chef from South Pasadena, California
2nd/3rd - Dan Langan, Personal Trainer from Havertown, Pennsylvania 
2nd/3rd - Susana Mijares, Bakery Owner from San Antonio, Texas
4th - Kenny Magana, Pastry Research & Development from Reading, Pennsylvania
5th - Audrey McGinnis, Home Caterer from Frisco, Texas	
6th - William "Will" Poole, Pastry Chef from New Ipswich, New Hampshire
7th - Dustin Charbonneau, Executive Pastry Chef from Chicago, Illinois	
8th - Najie Mercedes, Pastry Chef from Miami, Florida

Elimination Table

 (WINNER) The contestant won the competition.
 (RUNNER-UP) The contestant made it to the finale, but did not win.
‡ The contestant won the Preheat challenge for that week.
 (WIN) The contestant won the Main Heat challenge for that week.
 (HIGH) The contestant was one of the selection committee's favorites for that week.
 (IN) The contestant performed well enough to move on to the next week.  
 (LOW) The contestant was one of the selection committee's three or four least favorites for that week, but was not eliminated.
 (OUT) The contestant was the selection committee's least favorite for that week, and was eliminated.

Season 3 (2017)
This season featured nine professional and home bakers competing in a seven-episode baking tournament with a grand prize of $50,000. The season premiere aired the first and second episodes together. The last two episodes aired as a two=hour finale. Jesse Palmer replaced Bobby Deen as host for this season.

Contestants
1st - Jordan Pilarski, Pastry Chef from Amelia Island, Florida
2nd/3rd - Adam Young, Bakery Owner and Head Pastry Chef from Mystic, Connecticut
2nd/3rd - Daniela Copenhaver, Online Caterer & Baker from Chula Vista, California
4th - John Reed, Bakery owner from Shamong Township, New Jersey
5th - Courtney Rezendes, Culinary Instructor from Fall River, Massachusetts
6th - Fausto Barragan, School Principal from La Puente, California
7th - Heather Walker, Home Baker from Scottsdale, Arizona
8th - Samirah Williams, Boutique bakery owner from Philadelphia, Pennsylvania
9th - Mark Heyward-Washington, Pastry Chef from Charleston, South Carolina

Elimination Table

 (WINNER) The contestant won the competition.
 (RUNNER-UP) The contestant made it to the finale, but did not win.
‡ The contestant won the Preheat challenge for that week.
 (WIN) The contestant won the Main Heat challenge for that week.
 (HIGH) The contestant was one of the selection committee's favorites for that week.
 (IN) The contestant performed well enough to move on to the next week.  
 (LOW) The contestant was one of the selection committee's least favorites for that week, but was not eliminated.
 (OUT) The contestant was the selection committee's least favorite for that week, and was eliminated.

: The Preheat challenge in the second episode was a team challenge; Adam and Daniela thus won as a team.

Season 4 (2018)
This season featured the most bakers to this point, with 10 contestants (including a baker from Canada) competing in an eight-episode baking tournament for a chance at $50,000. Ali Kahn took over as host.

: Winner Nacho Aguirre is married to Susana Mijares who was a finalist in season 2 of Spring Baking Championship

Contestants
1st - Nacho Aguirre, Chef and Owner from San Antonio, Texas
2nd/3rd - Caleb Fischer, Chef de Cuisine from Auburn, Alabama
2nd/3rd - Cristina Vazquez, Pastry Cook from Fair Lawn, New Jersey
4th - Heather Wong, Pastry Chef from Burbank, California  
5th - Aaron McInnis, Nutritionist from Newfoundland, Canada
6th - Ruby Bloch, Baker from New Orleans, Louisiana	
7th - Jessica Duggan, Home Baker from Puyallup, Washington
8th - Deepal Patel, Senior Pastry Chef from Kansas City, Missouri
9th - Andrew Belen, Baker from Chicago, Illinois
10th - Michelle Kaiser, Bakery Owner from Omaha, Nebraska

Elimination Table

 (WINNER) The contestant won the competition.
 (RUNNER-UP) The contestant made it to the finale, but did not win.
‡ The contestant won the Preheat challenge for that week.
 (WIN) The contestant won the Main Heat challenge for that week.
 (HIGH) The contestant was one of the selection committee's favorites for that week.
 (IN) The contestant performed well enough to move on to the next week.  
 (LOW) The contestant was one of the selection committee's three or four least favorites for that week, but was not eliminated.
 (OUT) The contestant was the selection committee's least favorite for that week, and was eliminated.

: The Preheat challenge in the third episode was a team challenge so Nacho and Ruby won as a team.

Season 5 (2019)
Air Dates: March 18, 2019 - May 6, 2019.  Ten contestants competed in this season for $25,000 (half the prize money of past seasons) and a feature in Food Network Magazine. The new host of this season is Clinton Kelly.

Contestants
 1st: Cory Barrett – Culinary Instructor from Kalamazoo, Michigan
 2nd/3rd: Karina Rivera – Head Pastry Chef from Miami, Florida
 2nd/3rd: Saber Rejbi – Executive Pastry Chef from Chicago, Illinois
 4th: Riccardo Menicucci – Executive Pastry Chef from San Francisco, California
 5th: Tracey Marionneaux – Executive Pastry Chef from Chicago, Illinois
 6th: Marqessa Gesualdi – Bakery Owner and Pastry Chef from Philadelphia, Pennsylvania
 7th: Jordan Kanouse – Pastry Chef from New Orleans, Louisiana
 8th: Kevin Dillmon – Bakery Owner from Rome, Georgia
 9th: Jessica Colvin – Home Baker from Southlake, Texas
 10th: Kendra Stephens – Executive Pastry Chef from Washington, DC

Elimination Table

 (WINNER) The contestant won the competition.
 (RUNNER-UP) The contestant made it to the finale, but did not win.
‡ The contestant won the Preheat challenge for that week.
 (WIN) The contestant won the Main Heat challenge for that week.
 (HIGH) The contestant was one of the selection committee's favorites for that week.
 (IN) The contestant performed well enough to move on to the next week.  
 (LOW) The contestant was one of the selection committee's three or four least favorites for that week, but was not eliminated.
 (OUT) The contestant was the selection committee's least favorite for that week, and was eliminated.

: The Preheat challenge in the third episode was a team challenge so Cory and Kevin won as a team.

Season 6 (2020)

Contestants
1st- Sohrob Esmaili from San Francisco, California
2/3rd- Arin Hiebert from Calgary, Alberta
2/3rd- Tati Vernot from Miami, Florida
4th- Val Criado from San Antonio, Texas
5th- Christine Nguyen from Sugar Land, Texas
6th- Aris Rodriguez from Sedona, Arizona
7th- Molly Matthaei from Jackson Hole, Wyoming
8th- Aisha Momaney from New York, New York
9th- Franck Iglesias from Old Saybrook, Connecticut
10th- Sandra Danso-Boadi from Mississauga, Ontario
11th- Anibal Rodriguez from Rio Grande, Puerto Rico

Elimination Table

 (WINNER) The contestant won the competition.
 (RUNNER-UP) The contestant made it to the finale, but did not win.
‡ The contestant won the Preheat challenge for that week.
 (WIN) The contestant won the Main Heat challenge for that week.
 (HIGH) The contestant was one of the selection committee's favorites for that week.
 (IN) The contestant performed well enough to move on to the next week.  
 (LOW) The contestant was one of the selection committee's three or four least favorites for that week, but was not eliminated.
 (OUT) The contestant was the selection committee's least favorite for that week, and was eliminated.

Season 7 (2021)
11 bakers enter the kitchen to compete for the $25,000 prize, a chance to be featured in Food Network Magazine, and the title of Spring Baking Champion. This season, bakers will be ranked on "The Spring Board" after each pre-heat and main heat. The lowest ranking baker on the board after each main heat will be eliminated.

Elimination Table

Contestants
 1st - Keya Wingfield, pastry chef and bakery owner from Richmond, Virginia
 2nd - Natalie Soto, cake artist from Capistrano Beach, California
 3rd - Derek Corsino, culinary arts instructor from Saint Helena, California
 4th - Veruska Samanez, pastry chef and bakery owner from Cedar Grove, New Jersey
 5th - Chiantae Campbell, bakery owner from Miami, Florida
 6th - Madiha Chughtai, home baker from Richmond, Texas
 7th - Jahmal Dailey, pastry chef from Brooklyn, New York
 8th - Stephanie DeVoll, pastry chef and bakery owner from Norwalk, California
 9th - Laurent Carratie, executive pastry chef from Mendham, New Jersey
 10th - LeeAnn Tolentino, pastry chef from Los Angeles, California
 11th - Dayron Santamaria, executive pastry chef from Takoma Park, Maryland

Season 8 (2022)
Twelve bakers enter the Spring Baking Barn to create delicious desserts featuring the freshest fruit and flowers the farm has to offer! In the first round, host Molly Yeh challenges the bakers to make fruit tarts that showcase their distinct personalities. Then, the bakers must fight to remain in the game with a floral bonanza cake that wows judges Kardea Brown, Nancy Fuller, and Duff Goldman.

Contestants
1st-Jaleesa Mason from Spanish Harlem, New York 
2/3rd-Dennis Van from Austin, Texas
2/3rd-Carolyn Portuondo from Honolulu, Hawaii
4th-Romuald “Romy” Guiot from Los Angeles, California
5th-Tom Smallwood from New York City, New York
6th-Justin Ross from Richmond, Virginia
7th-Diego Chiarello from Houston, Texas
8th-Kim Wood from Simsbury, Connecticut
9th-Annabelle Asher  from Fort Lauderdale, Florida
10thStephon Cook from New Orleans, Louisiana
11th-Jenniffer Woo from Palm Beach Gardens, Florida
12thYohan Lee from Nashville, Tennessee
12th-Alexis Wells from Carlsbad, California

Elimination Table

Season 9 (2023)
12 talented bakers bake their way through spring challenges that all deal with love. With the help of host Jesse Palmer the bakers bake their best to impress the three judges, Nancy Fuller, Kardea Brown, and Duff Goldman.

Contestants
Molly Richards, Home Baker from Natchez, Mississippi
April Franqueza , Pastry Chef from Sapphire, North Carolina
Jessica Quiet , French Pastry Chef from Stowe, Vermont
Christian Velez , Culinary Arts Teacher from Hollywood, Florida
Jai Xiong, Culinary Instructor from Savage, Minnesota
Manja Blackwood, Executive sous chef from Tucson, Arizona
Luke Deardurff , Executive Pastry chef from Bronx, New York
Josh Cain, Chocolatier from Orlando, Florida
Clement Le Deore , Home Baker from San Diego, California 
Michelle Henry, Bakery Owner from McAllen, Texas
11th- Victoria Casinelli, Pastry chef from Shelton, Connecticut
12th- Keem Jackson, Pastry Chef from Baltimore, Maryland

Elimination Table

Spring Baking Championship Easter
8 easter obsessed bakers bake their way through an Easter obsessed baking competition. With the help of host Sunny Anderson(Seasons 1-2) the bakers bake their best to impress the three judges, Stephanie Boswell(Seasons 1-2), Zac Young(season 2), and Jordan Andino(Season 1).

Season 1

Elimination Table

Season 2

Elimination Table

References

Notes 
1.The baker who the judges think did the best at the twist received immunity from elimination.
2.Jaleesa and Carolyn won as a team. While Romy won as an individual.
3. Marco Salden from Denver, Colorado competed against Stephon Cook for a spot in the competition in the main heat Season 8 Episode 2, but ultimately lost.

External links